Phillip Tabet (born July 1, 1987 in Michigan, United States) is a Lebanese professional basketball player currently playing for Champville SC in the Lebanese Basketball League. Tabet was put on the Lebanese Free Agent List to play for the national squad along with twin brother Charles Tabet. Tabet started his college career at the University of South Alabama before deciding to move to Lebanon to sign his first professional contract for the Lebanese green castle Hekmeh BC along with twin brother Charles. However, in 2014 Phillip split from his brother to join Beirut side Champville SC.

References

External links 
 

1987 births
Living people
Lebanese men's basketball players
Sportspeople from Michigan
Centers (basketball)
Power forwards (basketball)
Sagesse SC basketball players